The Foday Landfort (揽福) is a mid-size body-on-frame sport utility vehicle (SUV) produced by Foday since 2003. It is the base of the Foday Lion F22 pickup truck, and it was developed and destined mainly for the Asia-Pacific region.

Overview

The Foday Landfort was launched in November 2014 as a 2015 model in the Chinese market as a 7-seater body-on-frame mid-size SUV. The suspension system is double wishbone spiral spring independent suspension for the front and five-point spiral spring type non-independent suspension for the rear.

Interior
The interior features a 7-inch screen and DVD with aux-in compatibility.

Powertrain
Transmission options are five-speed manual and six-speed automatic transmissions, with both two-wheel drive and four-wheel drive available for configuration with rear-wheel-drive layout as standard and optional four-wheel-drive.

Markets
In Malaysia, Enggang Keramat Automobile launched a Malaysian car brand called SAF, named after the arrangement of Muslims in prayer in April 2016. The lineup of the SAF brand consists of rebadged models from the Chinese brand Foday. The rebadged models include the Lion F22 pick-up truck and the Landfort seven-seater SUV, with the two vehicles rebadged as the SAF Striker and SAF Landfort respectively with the designs still being identical to the original Foday models. Both models are being produced at Oriental Assemblers, the same company that also assembles Chery models in Malaysia in Tampoi, Johor.

References

External links 

  

Cars introduced in 2015
Mid-size sport utility vehicles
2010s cars
Rear-wheel-drive vehicles
All-wheel-drive vehicles